The Octet in E-flat major by Ludwig van Beethoven, Op. 103, is a work for two oboes, two clarinets, two bassoons, and two horns. Beethoven wrote the work in 1792 in Bonn before he established himself in Vienna. He reworked and expanded the Octet in 1795 as his first String Quintet, Op. 4. The Octet was not published until 1834 by Artaria, thus explaining the high opus number despite its date of composition.

The frontispiece of the autograph score contains the phrase "in a concert", proving that the piece was destined (at least at one stage) for a concert.

Structure

The composition is in four movements:
Allegro
Andante
Menuetto
Presto

References
Notes

Sources

External links

Chamber music by Ludwig van Beethoven
1793 compositions
Compositions for octet
Compositions in E-flat major
Compositions by Ludwig van Beethoven published posthumously